The fourth season (2017–2018) of the Turkish TV series, Diriliş: Ertuğrul, created by Mehmet Bozdağ, succeeds the third season and precedes the fifth and final season of Diriliş: Ertuğrul.

Plot 
It is believed that Ertuğrul is dead despite the truth being that he is actually captured by some slave traders. Meanwhile, Emir Sadettin convinces Dündar, Ertuğrul's brother and the new Kayı Bey, into selling Hanlı Pazar and moving back to Gündoğdu's tribe but is stopped upon Ertuğrul's return and is forthwith banished. After Ertuğrul's son, Gündüz, is kidnapped, Ertuğrul declares war against Karacahisar and is successful in conquering it. Following Ares' capture, Ertuğrul takes him to the Sultan and tells him to confess to the Sultan about Sadettin Köpek's misdeeds. The plan nearly works but Köpek is saved by the Sultan's wife, Mahperi Hatun and leads to an event turning Tekfur Ares, later killed by Noyan, into a Muslim. Soon after that, the Sultan is killed and Köpek's increase in power in the palace creates problems for the new Sultan, Gıyaseddin. Gıyaseddin allies with Ertuğrul and with the help of Hüsamettin Karaca, Köpek is beheaded. After this, Ertuğrul faces the return of Noyan but is successful in defeating him and his devious sister, Alangoya, who attempted to kill Ertuğrul's son, Osman, who was born on the same day as his mother's death. Noyan prepares for a battle, historically known as the Battle of Köse Dağ and the Kayı move to Söğüt.

Cast

Main characters 
 Engin Altan Düzyatan as Ertuğrul Bey
 Hülya Darcan as Hayme Ana
 Esra Bilgiç as Halime Hatun
 Cengiz Coşkun as Turgut Alp
 Nurettin Sönmez as Bamsı Beyrek
  as Sadettin Köpek
 Burak Dakak as Sultan Gıyaseddin Keyhüsrev
 Cemal Hünal as Tekfur Ares / Ahmet Alp

Supporting characters 
 Gülsim Ali as Aslıhan Hatun
  as Hafsa Hatun
 Ayberk Pekcan as Artuk Bey
 Ozman Sirgood as İbn-i Arabi
 Burak Hakkı as Sultan Alaeddin Keykubat
 Engin Öztürk as Günalp Bey
 Ertuğrul Postoğlu as Bahadır Bey
  as Titan
 Sinem Öztürk as Mahperi Hatun
 Barış Bağcı as Baycu Noyan
  as Sungurtekin Bey
 Batuhan Karacakaya as Dündar Bey

Minor characters 

 Sera Tokdemir as Marya
 Melih Özdoğan as Samsa Alp
Celal Al as Abdurrhahman Alp
 Edip Zeydan as Dumrul Alp
 Hasan Küçükçetin as Atabey Şemseddin Altun Aba
 Orhan Kılıç as Atsiz Bey
 Arda Öziri as Göktug 
 Ergun Taş as Aziz
 Hakan Serim as Günkut Alp
 Yaman Tümen as Gündüz Alp
 Hakan Bozyiğit as Komutan Kostas
 Aslıhan Güner as Karaca Hatun
 Gürbey İleri as Sancar Bey
  as Alçiçek Hatun
 Hakan Onat as Komutan Angelos
 Melikşah Özen as Melikşah Alp

Guest characters 
 Serdar Gökhan as Süleyman Şah
 Gönül Nagiyeva as Alangoya (spies under the name Almıla Hatun)
 Burak Demir as Hüsamettin Karaca
 Oya Unustası as Sügay Hatun
 Ali Bühara Mete as Mergen (disguised as Eynece)
 Hasan Şahintürk as Tekfur Kritos
 Mert Soyyer as Aleko
 Levent Sülün as Simko
 Alper Atak as Antheus
 Merve Kızıl as Esma Hatun
 Sezanur Sözer as Eftalya
  as Ögedei Han

Episodes

Notes

References

External links 
 

Diriliş: Ertuğrul and Kuruluş: Osman
2017 television seasons